Chen Siqing (born 2 April 1960) is a Chinese banker who is the current chairman of the board of the Industrial and Commercial Bank of China, in office since April 2019. He previously served as chairman the board of the Bank of China and before that, president of the Bank of China.

He is an alternate member of the 19th Central Committee of the Chinese Communist Party and a representative of the 19th National Congress of the Chinese Communist Party.

Biography
Chen was born in Xiangyin County, Hunan, on 2 April 1960. In 1982, he entered Hubei College of Finance and Economics (now Zhongnan University of Economics and Law), majoring in the Infrastructure Finance and Credit Department. He also earned his M.B.A. from Murdoch University in 1999.

Beginning in 1990, he served in several posts in the Bank of China, including assistant president and vice president of Fujian Branch, general manager of the Risk Management Department, and president of Guangdong Branch. He became vice president of the bank in June 2008. In February 2014, the bank has appointed him as its president, succeeding Li Lihui who has reached retirement age. On 31 July 2017, he was promoted to become chairman the board of the bank.

In April 2019, he was named chairman of the board of the Industrial and Commercial Bank of China, replacing Yi Huiman, who will become chairman of China Securities Regulatory Commission.

References

1960 births
Living people
People from Xiangyin County
Zhongnan University of Economics and Law alumni
Murdoch University alumni
People's Republic of China politicians from Hunan
Chinese Communist Party politicians from Hunan
Alternate members of the 19th Central Committee of the Chinese Communist Party